Sakhile is an African name which may refer to:

Sakhile, singer in Ndebele music
Sakhile, Mpumalanga a township near Standerton, South Africa